Terrible Mountain is a summit in Windsor County, Vermont, in the United States.

Terrible Mountain was likely so named by early settlers due to its terrain.

Accident 

On March 19, 1968, a Beechcroft G18S crashed into Terrible Mountain, killing all 7 people on board, 2 pilots and 5 passengers. The passengers were executives from the Jones and Lamson Company based in Springfield, VT and were flying on a private flight from Bridgeport, CT to Springfield, VT. The pilot had knowingly attempted to fly through foggy conditions with faulty instrumentation. The wreckage of the plane was never cleared, and still sits on top of the mountain. There is a small plastic plaque dedicated to one of the passengers who died, Burton B. Burks.

References

Mountains of Windsor County, Vermont
Mountains of Vermont